Kshitij Baliram Shinde (born 23 March 1984) is a Singaporean cricketer.

Career
He played in the 2014 ICC World Cricket League Division Three tournament. He has played a first-class match for Maharashtra cricket team in 2005 against Tamil Nadu cricket team at MA Chidambaram Stadium in Chennai where he scored 0 and 17 after opening the innings.

References

External links
 
 Cricketarchive
 	

1984 births
Living people
Singaporean cricketers
Indian cricketers
Maharashtra cricketers
Cricketers from Pune
Wicket-keepers